Esteban Ariel Saveljich (born 20 May 1991) is a professional footballer who plays as a centre-back for Spanish club Rayo Vallecano. Born in Argentina, he represents the Montenegro national team at international level.

Club career
Born in Tandil, Buenos Aires Province, Argentina, Saveljich joined Racing Club's youth setup in 2006, aged 15. On 23 June 2012, he made his first team – and Primera División – debut, in a 2–1 away loss against Vélez Sársfield.

Saveljich scored his first professional goal on 1 April 2014, in a 3–3 home draw against Estudiantes. He was also a part of the squad which was crowned champions in that year, but as a backup.

In January 2015 Saveljich was loaned to fellow top tier club Defensa y Justicia, until the end of the year. He appeared in 24 matches, scoring once, as his side avoided relegation.

On 24 January 2016, Saveljich moved abroad, signing a six-month loan deal with Segunda División side UD Almería. On 18 August, he signed a permanent four-year deal with fellow league team Levante UD.

On 4 August 2017, after contributing sporadically to the Valencian club's promotion to La Liga, Saveljich was loaned to Albacete Balompié in the second level, for one year. On 31 August 2018, he returned to Almería on loan for the 2018–19 campaign.

On 26 July 2019, Saveljich agreed to a permanent four-year deal with Rayo Vallecano, freshly relegated to the second division.

International career
Saveljich obtained Montenegrin nationality in 2015. He was called up for international matches of Montenegro versus Denmark and Sweden in June 2015, both of which he entered as a substitute. In a Euro 2016 qualifying match against Russia, he was in the starting line-up.
Under Ljubiša Tumbaković, the new head coach of Montenegro national team, he played in a friendly match against Greece.

Personal life
Saveljich, a Montenegrin Argentine, is the cousin of former Montenegrin footballer Niša Saveljić. His paternal great-grandfather and grandmother were immigrants from Montenegro.

Saveljich is nicknamed el Polaco (The Pole) by Argentine media, due to his hair colour. Conversely, in Montenegro he is nicknamed Gaucho.

Career statistics

Club

International

Honours
Racing Avellaneda
Argentine Primera División: 2014

Levante UD
Segunda División: 2016–17

References

External links

1991 births
Living people
People from Tandil
Argentine people of Montenegrin descent
Argentine footballers
Montenegrin footballers
Association football central defenders
Argentine Primera División players
Racing Club de Avellaneda footballers
Defensa y Justicia footballers
La Liga players
Segunda División players
UD Almería players
Levante UD footballers
Albacete Balompié players
Rayo Vallecano players
Argentine expatriate footballers
Montenegrin expatriate footballers
Argentine expatriate sportspeople in Spain
Montenegrin expatriate sportspeople in Spain
Expatriate footballers in Spain
Montenegro international footballers
Sportspeople from Buenos Aires Province